Eschershausen was a Samtgemeinde ("collective municipality") in the district of Holzminden, in Lower Saxony, Germany. Its seat was in the town Eschershausen. On 1 January 2011, it merged with the former Samtgemeinde Stadtoldendorf to form the new Samtgemeinde Eschershausen-Stadtoldendorf.

The Samtgemeinde Eschershausen consisted of the following municipalities:

 Dielmissen 
 Eimen 
 Eschershausen
 Holzen
 Lüerdissen

Former Samtgemeinden in Lower Saxony